Banyuwangi International Airport  (formerly code: WARB) is an airport at Blimbingsari, which serves Banyuwangi city and surrounding area in East Java, Indonesia. It was formerly known as Blimbingsari Airport. It was opened for operations in December 2010. It is termed as the first green airport of Indonesia. The airport is managed by PT Angkasa Pura II (Persero), after being handed over by the Ministry of Transportation on 22 December 2017.

In 2010 the airport only served 7,386 passengers, but in 2017 it served 140,683 passengers, an increase of 1,700 percent in seven years. It increased again significantly to 307,157 passengers in just 10 months of 2018.

In 2022, the airport was announced as one of the six winners of the Aga Khan Award for Architecture.

Development and extension

Construction was initiated in 2002, with vice president Hamzah Haz placing the cornerstone. Cases related to land acquisition resulted in two regents of Banyuwangi - Samsul Hadi and Ratna Ani Lestari being convicted of corruption.

In 2011 it served only 7,826 passengers, and in 2015 served more than 110,000 passengers. Another expansion and development program was undertaken to convert the airport as an international low Cost Carrier Airport (LCCA). The construction done at the airport includes:

Extension of runway to accommodate Boeing 737-8 NG, 737-9 ER and Airbus A320
Extension of parking apron to 34,000 m2, which can accommodate nine narrow bodied aircraft
Extension and widening of runway to 2500x45 m2
Expansion of parking area from to 5000 m2, with capacity of 260 vehicles), and 
Expansion of airport terminal to 20.000 m2

Terminal and runway

The airport terminal is designed to resemble a traditional house from East Java's Osing tribe, with an open-air concept that reduces dependency on air conditioners. The terminal has an area of about 20,000 square meters, which can accommodate two million passengers annually. The runway of the airport is 2500 x 45 square meters, the apron area (41,000 square meters) can accommodate nine narrow-bodied aircraft.

The airport was designated as a buffer airport for I Gusti Ngurah Rai International Airport during 2018 IMF-World Bank Annual Meeting in Bali held in October 2018.

Airlines and destinations

Statistics

References 

Airports in East Java
Buildings and structures in East Java
Transport in East Java